South Qu'Appelle is a former provincial electoral division for the Legislative Assembly of the province of Saskatchewan, Canada. The district was created before the 1st Saskatchewan general election in 1905, and abolished before the 8th Saskatchewan general election in 1934 into Qu'Appelle-Wolseley and parts of Lumsden and Francis. It was the riding of former Premier of the North-West Territories and Saskatchewan Opposition leader Frederick Haultain.

It is now part of the constituencies of Indian Head-Milestone and Regina Wascana Plains.

Members of the Legislative Assembly

Election results

|-

|style="width: 130px"|Provincial Rights
|Frederick William Gordon Haultain
|align="right"|1,568
|align="right"|58.55%
|align="right"|–

|- bgcolor="white"
!align="left" colspan=3|Total
!align="right"|2,678
!align="right"|100.00%
!align="right"|

|-

|style="width: 130px"|Provincial Rights
|Frederick William Gordon Haultain
|align="right"|1,056
|align="right"|58.54%
|align="right"|-0.01

|- bgcolor="white"
!align="left" colspan=3|Total
!align="right"|1,804
!align="right"|100.00%
!align="right"|

|-

|style="width: 130px"|Conservative
|Frederick William Gordon Haultain
|align="right"|753
|align="right"|51.72%
|align="right"|-6.82

|- bgcolor="white"
!align="left" colspan=3|Total
!align="right"|1,456
!align="right"|100.00%
!align="right"|

|-

|style="width: 130px"|Conservative
|Joseph Glenn
|align="right"|759
|align="right"|50.53%
|align="right"|-1.19

|- bgcolor="white"
!align="left" colspan=3|Total
!align="right"|1,502
!align="right"|100.00%
!align="right"|

|-

|style="width: 130px"|Conservative
|Joseph Glenn
|align="right"|1,524
|align="right"|56.36%
|align="right"|+5.83

|- bgcolor="white"
!align="left" colspan=3|Total
!align="right"|2,704
!align="right"|100.00%
!align="right"|

|-

|style="width: 130px"|Independent
|Donald H. McDonald
|align="right"|1,883
|align="right"|57.36%
|align="right"|+1.00

|- bgcolor="white"
!align="left" colspan=3|Total
!align="right"|3,283
!align="right"|100.00%
!align="right"|

|-

|- bgcolor="white"
!align="left" colspan=3|Total
!align="right"|3,134
!align="right"|100.00%
!align="right"|

|-

|Conservative
|William Levi Wait
|align="right"|1,404
|align="right"|42.77%
|align="right"|-6.53
|- bgcolor="white"
!align="left" colspan=3|Total
!align="right"|3,283
!align="right"|100.00%
!align="right"|

See also
South Qu'Appelle – Northwest Territories territorial electoral district (1870–1905).

Electoral district (Canada)
List of Saskatchewan provincial electoral districts
List of Saskatchewan general elections
List of political parties in Saskatchewan

References
 Saskatchewan Archives Board – Saskatchewan Election Results By Electoral Division

Former provincial electoral districts of Saskatchewan